World Series of Fighting 2: Arlovski vs. Johnson was a mixed martial arts event held on  at the Revel Casino in Atlantic City, New Jersey, United States.

Background
Anthony Johnson moved up to Heavyweight to face Andrei Arlovski.
According to a press release, the event peaked with 332,000 live viewers on NBC Sports Network, a peak increase of 46 percent from the promotion's inaugural event in November that peaked with 228,000 viewers.
The average didn't increase nearly as impressively as the peak, but it still rose with 210,000 live viewers, compared to the 198,000 average from the first event.

Results

See also 
 List of WSOF champions
 List of WSOF events

References

Events in Atlantic City, New Jersey
World Series of Fighting events
2013 in mixed martial arts